The Aspen RooftopComedy Festival was a stand-up comedy festival that was held annually in Aspen, Colorado on or around the Memorial Day Weekend since 2008.  The festival is the concept of Roxane Davis and the City Of Aspen.  Davis, a consultant and producer, created the partnership between rooftopcomedy.com and Aspen's Wheeler Opera House, a historic theater located in downtown Aspen.

The Aspen RooftopComedy Festival was designed to fill the gap left by HBO canceling the U.S. Comedy Arts Festival, which had been held in Aspen from 1985 - 2007. HBO has since renamed the festival and relocated it to Las Vegas, Nevada.  2008 marked the inaugural debut of the Aspen Rooftop Comedy Festival as a replacement to the former HBO event.

RooftopComedy.com brought the focus of the festival towards an underground talent base and an online media focus, and The Wheeler Opera House ensured that the festival transitioned to an event for the Aspen community by offering affordable tickets and local discounts on festival passes.  Whereas the HBO/U.S. Comedy Arts Festival had evolved into primarily an industry event, the producers of the new festival committed to creating a community for developing unproven comics, as well as presenting comedy for a devoted live-comedy audience.

The festival ran for three editions, being followed in 2011 by the Aspen Laff Festival.

2008 Festival Details
Performers

Dave Waite
Paul Varghese
Mike E. Winfield
Kevin Camia
Geoff Tate
Vladimir McTavish
Chris Porter
Vince Morris
Robert Hawkins
Tyrone Hawkins
Andi Smith
Isaac Witty
Lisa Landry
Auggie Smith
John Ramsey
Matt Braunger
Erin Foley
Robert Buscemi
Nathan Trenholm
Lamar Williams
Tig Notaro
Steve Wilson
Mike Lukas
Jimmy Dore
Tim Ball

Other Highlights

Industry Panel: Comedy meets New Media
A cross-section of new media and comedy industry leaders discuss how the Internet is impacting the comedy business, and how comedians are harnessing new media strategies to further their careers. Participating Panelists are below.  The discussion was moderated by RooftopComedy.
Mark Day, Comedy Content Manager, YouTube
Dylan Gadino, Editor-in-Chief, PunchlineMagazine.com
Allison Kingsley, Executive Producer/GM, Bushleague.tv
Mike Kwatinetz, General Partner, Azure Capital Partners
Kevan O'Brien, Digital Film and Video Specialist, Adobe

2008 RooftopComedy Awards
Awards were presented to comedians and those working in the field of online comedy who "are doing exciting, innovative and, yes, hilarious things."
Matt Braunger - Best of the Fest
Robert Hawkins - Rooftop Comics' Comic
Auggie Smith - Rooftop Clubs' Comic of the Year
Tyrone Hawkins - The Rooftop Golden Shingle
The Rooftop Rusty Nails
Matt Bearden
Jonathan Pace
Tabari McCoy
TJ Young
Albert Im
Jeff Wesselschmidt
Tim Harmston
Andy Erikson
Eddie Gossling - The Roofie
Go Bananas in Cincinnati, OH - Best Club for Emerging Talent
Go Bananas in Cincinnati, OH - Best Club to Work
MySpace Comedy Forum - Best Online Comedy Forum
Punchline Magazine - Best Online Industry Publication
Never Not Funny with Jimmy Pardo - Best Comedy Podcast
Michael Showalter Showalter - Best Sketch Comedy News Parody Shows
The Onion News Network - Best Comedy Web Shows and Series

National College Comedy Competition Finals
The Finals of the NCCC featured the top 4 students in the categories of Stand Up and Short Film from across the US competing for the title of Funniest College Student.  
Tim Ball from Duke University won in the Stand Up Category.
Dan Perrault from Emerson College won in the Short Film Category with Car Phone.

References

External links
Aspen Rooftop Comedy Festival - Official Festival Site
Stage Time - Stage Time Article discussing the festival
Aspen Comedy Festival - Dead Frog Article on the festival
 - Official site of Aspen's Wheeler Opera House

Festivals in Colorado
Comedy festivals in the United States
Tourist attractions in Aspen, Colorado